M-Sola Heliport  is an airport in Latvia. Not to be confused with Military Lielvarde Air Base, which is hosted by Latvian Air Force.

References

Airports in Latvia